Microvirga pakistanensis  is a Gram-negative, non-spore-forming, strictly aerobic and non-motile bacterium from the genus of Microvirga which has been isolated from desert soil from Cholistan desert in Pakistan.

References 

Hyphomicrobiales
Bacteria described in 2017